Amity School of Business, Kolkata is an under-graduate business school in Kolkata, West Bengal and is affiliated with the Amity University, Kolkata under the UGC. It is a part of the Amity Education Group and its BBA programme has been ranked constantly.

History
Amity School of Business in Kolkata was a part of Amity Global Business School (Sector V, Salt Lake) which was established in the year 2008. Now, it is a part of Amity University, Kolkata. It has been there in other cities since 1991 under the Amity Education Group.

References

Business schools in Kolkata
Educational institutions established in 2008
2008 establishments in West Bengal